is a hybrid Japanese citrus, with a characteristic "golden" bright yellow color.

Though not completely seedless, the seeds are few in number. The yellowness is inherited from its mother plant (seed parent), a small-sized variety known as Ōgonkan or "Golden Orange", which has been crossed with the Imamura unshiu variety of satsuma orange for size and other desired traits.  The cultivar was developed by an agricultural experiment station run by the Kanagawa Prefecture.

History 

Shōnan gold was first cultivated in 1988, by hybrid crossing the  Citrus flaviculpus with  Citrus unshiu cv.  (a variety of Satsuma orange). It is thought to be a nucellar seedling of the mother plant Ōgonkan.

Further seed selection and propagation was continued until the 12th year (1999) to establish stability of characteristics. The hybrid was registered with the name "Shōnan Gold" (registration number 11469) at Japan's Ministry of Agriculture, Forestry and Fisheries (MAFF) in 2003, and the first harvest took place that same year. Shipment started in 2006 (FY2005) with about 2.0 metric tons officially entering the market, or about 450 kg according to a newspaper coverage.

Description 
The sphere-shaped fruit averages about 77 g (2.72 oz) each in weight and the rind or peel is yellow. The flesh or pulp is tender, succulent, and sweet, with sugar concentration typically 11–12°Bx (i.e. 11–12% by mass). It is fragrant like the Ōgonkan, but is smoother-skinned and easier to peel by hand. The fruit ripens during April and retains excellent flavor until May, which exactly targets the months when the unshū (satsuma) oranges run scarce in the Japanese market.

Cultivation 

The young sapling is thorny and grows upright, but as it ages, it loses its thorns and begins to spread its limbs laterally. To encourage earlier fruiting, it is important to train the branches on the young tree so they fan out. Fruiting is bountiful, but has alternate year bearing (biennial bearing) tendencies.

Crop yields 
The history of planted acreage, annual yields, and shipments, according to the agriculture ministry data are tabulated below.

In statistics up to 2010,  Kanagawa prefecture accounted for 100% of Shonan Gold production in Japan. The major producers are the city of Odawara and the town of Yugawara.

The year is fiscal year, so the first shipment, given as FY2005 in the above data, really occurred in 2006.

Gallery

Explanatory notes

Notes

References 

with English abstracts
 (w/English title and abstract) Agriknowledge (with PDF link); Agri-kanagawa (pdf)
 =

Japanese only resources
 
="'Shōnan Gold,' a new type citrus larger, smoother-skinned, and refreshing tasting than ōgonkan", in: 'Kenkyū seika jōhō vol./year 2000, p. 370-1)

External links 

Citrus hybrids
Food plant cultivars
Fruits originating in East Asia
Japanese fruit